Cyrtogrammus is a genus of longhorn beetles of the subfamily Lamiinae, containing the following species:

 Cyrtogrammus laosicus Breuning, 1968
 Cyrtogrammus lateripictus Gressitt, 1939
 Cyrtogrammus sumatranus Franz, 1954

References

Xylorhizini